Morbidity and mortality may refer to:
Morbidity and Mortality (journal), now known as Morbidity and Mortality Weekly Report, a weekly publication by the Centers for Disease Control and Prevention
Morbidity and mortality conference, a periodic conference in many medical centers usually held to review cases with poor or avoidable outcomes

See also
 Morbidity,  a diseased state, disability, or poor health
 Mortality (disambiguation)
 Mortality rate, a measure of the number of deaths in a given population